Bahren Shaari was the chief executive officer of Bank of Singapore, a position he had held from February 2015 to 31 December 2022.  Under his leadership, the bank's reach has expanded around the world and has offices in Singapore, Europe, Dubai and Hong Kong.

Bahren was also touted to be a potential candidate from the private sector for Singapore Presidential Elections in 2017 by a number of Singapore media, following the changes in the eligibility criteria for elected president. He declined to not participate for the Singapore Presidential Elections in 2017.

Early life and education 
Bahren was born and educated in Singapore. He studied in Sembawang Primary School, Ahmad Ibrahim Secondary School and Hwa Chong Junior College. He graduated from the National University of Singapore with a bachelor's degree in Accountancy.

Career 
Bahren started his career as an auditor at Coopers and Lybrand. After two years, he moved to the financial industry. He joined American Express in 1988 before moving to UBS AG Wealth Management in 1996,  where he rose to become the managing director and Head of Southeast Asia and Australia team He then joined ING Asia Private Bank as  Senior Managing Director and Global Head for the Southeast Asia market. In 2009 it  was renamed Bank of Singapore after it was acquired by OCBC Bank in the same year.

In September 2016, Bahren was among the six recipients of the Institute of Banking and Finance Distinguished Fellows award.

External appointments and honours 
Bahren was appointed by the Monetary Authority of Singapore to serve on the Corporate Governance Advisory Committee in Feb 2019.

In October 2018, he was named the Berita Harian Achiever of the Year in recognition of his professional achievements and contributions to the community. The award was given by Berita Harian, the sole Malay language broadsheet newspaper published in Singapore.

Following that, Bahren was one of 12 outstanding alumni honored at the NUS Business School Eminent Business Alumni Awards 2018.

In September 2016, Bahren was among the six recipients of the Institute of Banking and Finance Distinguished Fellows award, .

He was appointed to the board of the Maritime and Port Authority of Singapore in 2000, and stepped down in 2012. He has been an independent director of the Singapore Press Holdings since April 2012.

Bahren was conferred the Public Service Star Medal in 2018. He received the Public Service Medal by the President of Singapore in 2008.

On 1 April 2017, Bahren was appointed as an alternate member to the Council of Presidential Advisers to serve a term of four years. He was then appointed as a full member on 9 January 2020.

Private life 
Bahren's wife, June Rusdon, is the founder of Learning Vision Group and Chief Executive of BusyBees Asia. They have three children.

References 

Singaporean chief executives
National University of Singapore alumni